702 is a year. 

702 may also refer to:
702 (number), the number 702
Area code 702, the area code of Las Vegas, Nevada
702 (band), an American R&B band from Las Vegas
Radio 702, a radio station in Johannesburg, South Africa
702 ABC Sydney, the local radio station of the Australian Broadcasting Corporation in Sydney, Australia.
Section 702 of the FISA in the United States which authorizes warrantless electronic surveillance
Boeing 702, a communications satellite design.
IOS version history#iOS 7, the 7.0.2 update to Apple's iOS operating system